The 1924 Victorian state election was held in the Australian state of Victoria on Thursday 26 June 1924 to elect the 65 members of the state's Legislative Assembly.

Background

Seat changes
There had been four by-elections in Nationalist-held seats during the previous parliamentary term: Labor had won the seats of Daylesford on 9 August 1923 and Dalhousie on 31 January 1924. The Nationalists retained the seat of Gippsland South on 18 August 1922, but lost Gippsland West to the Country Party.

Results

Legislative Assembly

|}
Notes:
Twenty seats were uncontested at this election, and were retained by the incumbent parties:
Labor (12): Abbotsford, Brunswick, Carlton, Collingwood, Fitzroy, Flemington, North Melbourne, Port Fairy, Port Melbourne, Richmond, Warrenheip, Williamstown
Nationalist (5): Allandale, Gippsland South, Kara Kara, St Kilda, Waranga
Country (3): Gippsland East, Goulburn Valley, Wangaratta

Outcome
The Peacock minority government was defeated; a minority Labor Government led by George Prendergast took office but was defeated in Parliament in November 1924 by the Allan Coalition Government.

See also
Candidates of the 1924 Victorian state election
Members of the Victorian Legislative Assembly, 1924–1927

References

1924 elections in Australia
Elections in Victoria (Australia)
1920s in Victoria (Australia)
June 1924 events